Utah State Route 157 (SR-157) is a state highway in Carbon County in the U.S. state of Utah.

Route description
State Route 157 begins on US-6/US-191 at the Poplar Street/Hill Street interchange in the city of Helper. From there the route travels east  along Poplar Street before turning south onto South Main Street. The route then continues south  along South Main Street (which becomes North Spring Glen Road) toward Spring Glen, parallel to US-6/US-191, before turning east onto Kenilworth Road (initially 4500 North).

History
State Route 157 was established in 1933 as connecting what was then SR-8 (now US-6) between Helper and Spring Glen with Kenilworth. In 1953, the state legislature designated State Route 244 in 1953 as a loop off US-6 (then also US-50) in Helper, running along Poplar Street and Main Street. The west end of SR-157 was later extended north to SR-244 in Helper.
In 2013, SR-244 was removed from the State Highway System, but the section of the former state route along Poplar Street (from US-6/US-191 to South Main Street) was added to SR-157. The result is the current alignment of SR-157 (south from Helper to Kenilworth road, thence northeast to Kenilworth).

The entirety of the former SR-244 designation, which includes the Poplar Street segment of modern SR-157, remains signed as U.S. Route 6 Business.

Major intersections

References

External links

 157
157